101 Ways to Leave a Gameshow is a British game show produced by Initial (a subsidiary of Endemol UK) for the BBC hosted by Steve Jones and Nemone. On each episode, eight contestants compete for a £10,000 prize by picking the correct answers to general knowledge questions, all the while standing on a tower configured for various stunts. Competitors who pick incorrect answers are eliminated from the show in a variety of different ways, usually involving a drop into a large pool of water at the base of the tower. The show made its debut on BBC One on 10 July 2010 and ended on 28 August 2010. An American version hosted by Jeff Sutphen premiered on ABC on 21 June 2011.

Format
The show's production company, Endemol, describes the show as "the play-along fun of a glitzy, Saturday night quiz with the full-on adrenaline rush of an extreme stunt show." Each episode features eight contestants, with a mix of sexes, ages and backgrounds, competing to be the winner of the £10,000 prize in the UK version ($50,000 in the US version). Contestants are reduced one by one in the first four rounds, attempting to guess the correct answers to a selection of multiple-choice questions. The contestant who chooses the wrong answer will leave the show in spectacular fashion, in one of the 101 Ways to Leave a Gameshow. At any time during the first four rounds, a buzzer could sound, which announces the start of the Emergency Exit round. In this round, contestants are asked a series of questions at random, with the first contestant to give a wrong answer being eliminated. The Emergency Exit round is not used in either the US or Italian versions. In the final round, only three contestants remain (four contestants in the US version), who have to answer one last question in an attempt to win the jackpot prize.

Production
The show was created jointly by Endemol USA and Endemol UK. It was first produced by the UK division of Endemol for the BBC. Like its Saturday night stablemate, Total Wipeout, the show is filmed entirely at Endemol's filming facility in Benavídez, approximately 40 km Northwest of Buenos Aires, Argentina. Studio segments are generally filmed on three different levels, with the '101 Ways to Leave' segments recorded on the Tower's exterior. Some exits from the show are recorded on a disused airfield runway located adjacent to the tower. Most of the exits culminate in the contestant ending up in a large pool of water directly in front of the tower. The United States version was filmed at Agua Dulce, California, which is a popular filming location in Northern Los Angeles County. The site has an active general aviation airfield that was closed down during filming.

Gameplay
In each of the first four rounds, Nemone reveals the exit method that will be used to dismiss the losing contestant, numbered between 1 and 101. Jones then asks a question and reads as many answers as there are contestants still in the game; all but one of them are correct. After each contestant secretly chooses one answer, all reveal their selections. If any answer is chosen by multiple contestants, a tiebreaker question on the buzzer is used to determine which one of them gets to keep it. After all ties have been resolved, the remaining contestants select again from the unchosen answers. Further toss-ups are played as needed until all contestants have chosen different answers, at which point they are prepared for the exit. Jones reveals one correct answer at a time until only two contestants are left in jeopardy, then announces the wrong answer. The contestant who chose it is immediately eliminated from the game. Once per episode, a buzzer sounds off between rounds to indicate that an "Emergency Exit" round must be played. Jones asks a question to one contestant at a time in random order and the first to miss a question is eliminated. Once three contestants remain, the fifth and final round begins, following the same format as the previous four except that the question has only one right answer. The contestant who chooses it wins £10,000, while the other two are dismissed by exit #101, "The Trap Door"—being dropped through trapdoors on which they are standing to fall into the water below.

Exits used on the show
A total of 34 different exits were used over the course of the series, including #101 and the Emergency Exit that were common to all episodes.

International versions

For many of the international versions, the tower featured in the UK version was used. It's located near to the former site of Total Wipeout.

References

External links

101 Ways to Leave a Gameshow at Endemoluk.com

101 Ways to Leave a Gameshow at ABC

2010 British television series debuts
2010 British television series endings
2010s British game shows
BBC television game shows
English-language television shows
Television series by Banijay